Abu al-Ghazi Bahadur (Abulgazi, Ebulgazi, Abu-l-Ghazi, August 24, 1603 – 1663) was Khan of Khiva from 1643 to 1663. He spent ten years in Persia before becoming khan, and was very well educated, writing two historical works in the Khiva dialect of the Chagatai language. He was a descendant of Genghis Khan.

Life
He was born in Urgench, Khanate of Khiva, the son of ruler 'Arab Muhammad Khan. He fled to the Safavid court in Isfahan after a power struggle arose among him and his brothers. He lived there in exile from 1629 until 1639 studying Persian and Arabic history. In 1644 or 1645 he acceded to the throne, a position he would hold for twenty years. He died in Khiva in 1663.

Abu al-Ghazi is known as the author of two historical works: "Genealogy of the Turkmen" Shajara-i Tarākima finished in 1661 and "Genealogy of the Turks" Shajara-i Turk finished in 1665. These are important sources for modern knowledge of Central Asian history.

The Shajara-i Turk was Abu al-Ghazi's opus magnum, its title was variously translated as "Genealogy of the Turks" and "Genealogy of the Tatars", "shajara" being Turkic for "genealogy". Because using the word "Tatar" for "Turks" was a widely used misnomer, it is now obsolete to call the work "Shajara-i Turk" as "Genealogy of the Tatars" instead of "Genealogy of the Turks" since it's a work on the Turks. According to Abu al-Ghazi, in Shajara-i Turk he used the work of Rashid-al-Din Hamadani, Sharaf ad-Din Ali Yazdi, and other writers, totalling 18 historical sources, and corrected them in accordance with Turkic oral traditions which he was taught as a Prince. A manuscript of the Shajara-i Turk was purchased in Tobolsk from a Bukhara merchant by Swedish officers detained in Russian captivity in Siberia; using the local literate Tatars, the Swedish officers first translated the book into Russian, and then they retranslated it into various other languages. The French translation of the Shajara-i Turk was first published in Leiden in 1726, the French translation served as an original for a Russian translation published in 1768-1774, in 1780 it was published separately in German and English, and during the 18th century was widely read in Europe.

In the 19th and 20th centuries were published numerous critical translations of the Shajara-i Turk, which serve as historical sources for modern scholars. The first critical translation, performed by professional scholars, was published in Kazan in 1825. The Turkish translation of the text published in Kazan was done by philologist Ahmed Vefik Pasha and initially published in 1864. The most influential Western publication was Histoire des Mogols et des Tatares par Aboul-Ghazi Behadour Khan, publiée, traduite et annotée par le baron Desmaisons, St.-Pétersbourg, 1871-1874.

Nikita Bichurin was the first to notice that the biography of the epic ancestor of the Turkic people Oguz-Kagan by Abu al-Ghazi and the Turco-Persian manuscripts (Rashid al-Din, Hondemir, Abulgazi) has a striking similarity with the Maodun biography in the Chinese sources (feud between father and son and murder of the former, the direction and sequence of conquests, etc.). That observation, confirmed by other scholars, associated in the scientific literature the name of Maodun with the epic personality of the Oguz-Kagan. The similarity is even more remarkable because at the time of the writing, no Chinese annals were translated into either oriental or western languages, and Abu al-Ghazi could not have known about Eastern Huns or Maodun.

The literary significance of Shajara-i Turk is that Abu al-Ghazi openly spoke against Chaghatay literary language because it carried a strong Persian influence. Abu al-Ghazi language is easy, simple folk language of the Khiva Uzbeks and is quite different from the Chaghatay literary language. The style of Abu al-Ghazi, despite a scientific nature of his compositions, is distinguished by clarity and richness of vocabulary, and is interspersed with the falk Uzbek expressions and proverbs.

Abu al-Ghazi's son, Abu al-Muzaffar Anusha Muhammad Bahadur, reassigned to complete the work of his father Shajara-i Turk to a certain Mahmud bin Mulla Muhammad Zaman Urgench. It was finalized in 1665. The work lists a Turkic genealogy starting from biblical Adam and the primogenitor of the Turks, Oguz-Khan, and provides legendary details on their descendants including Chengiz Khan and the Shaybanid dynasty, providing a good picture of Mongol and Turkic views of history at that time.

Works
 Shajara-i Tarākima ("Genealogy of the Turkmens", 1659)
 Shajara-i Turk ("Genealogy of the Turks", 1665)
 Edition: 
 Translation:

Legacy
16413 Abulghazi, an asteroid which was discovered on 28 January 1987 by Eric Walter Elst at La Silla Observatory, Chile, was named after him.

References

Further reading

External links 
 "Abu al-Ghazi Bahadur." Encyclopædia Britannica. 2006. Encyclopædia Britannica Online. 11 June 2006 <http://search.eb.com/eb/article-9003414>

1603 births
1663 deaths
Historians of Central Asia
17th-century Iranian historians
Khans of Khiva
Uzbeks
Expatriates of the Khanate of Khiva in Iran